Nanchong North railway station is a railway station in Shunqing District, Nanchong, Sichuan, China. It is an intermediate stop on the Chongqing–Lanzhou railway and operated by China Railway Chengdu Group.

Construction of the station was approved in June 2013. Construction officially began on 22 May 2014 and the station opened on 30 December 2015. It will be a stop on the currently under construction Chengdu–Dazhou–Wanzhou high-speed railway and Hanzhong–Bazhong–Nanchong railway.

There are two island platforms and one side platform, making for five platform faces in total.

See also
Nanchong railway station

References 

Railway stations in Sichuan
Railway stations in China opened in 2015